Luca Kleve-Ruud (born 27 April 1978 in Pescara, Italy) is a Norwegian press photographer, based in Oslo.

Kleve-Ruud studied photojournalism at Høgskolen i Oslo. 
He is currently working for Dagens Næringsliv, Save the Children, and Samfoto/Scanpix, but has done several assignments for Red Cross, Amnesty and others. And was both freelance and staff photographer at Dagsavisen from 2006-2011. His pictures are featured in many magazines, newspapers and books.

Awards
2012
2. Prize Video Documentary

2011
Main Prize - Picture of the year, 2011
1. Prize News story - Picture of the year, 2011
1. Prize News - Picture of the year, 2011

2010
1. Prize News - Picture of the year, 2010

2009
1. Prize Portrait – Picture of the year, 2009
2. Prize Domestic documentary – Picture of the year, 2009

Book contributions
Teddy Petersen, ed. Sort of Safe: Photo Essays on Nordic Welfare. Århus: Ajour, 2009. .

Notes

External links
 Kleve-Ruud's blog
 Kleve-Ruud's website

Photographers from Oslo
Living people
1978 births